Horse Creek is a rural locality in the Rockhampton Region, Queensland, Australia.

Geography
The Dee River forms part of the western boundary.

The Burnett Highway runs through the eastern end.

Education 
There are no schools in Horse Creek. The nearest government primary and secondary schools are Mount Morgan State School and Mount Morgan State High School, both in neighbouring Mount Morgan to the north.

References 

Suburbs of Rockhampton Region
Localities in Queensland